The Ikorongo Game Reserve is a game reserve in Tanzania. The reserve was established in 1993. It is located along the left side of the northern part of Serengeti National Park.

The Ikorongo is rich in species of wild animals as the reserve have several rivers crisscrossing. Elephants, Rhino, Giraffe, Buffalo, Greater and Lesser Kudu, Hyena, Baboon, Zebra, Lion, Wild dogs, Grant's and Thomson's gazelle, Topi, Warthog and Duiker can be found here. Of the plants there are Riverine, wooded grassland and acacia.

References

Protected areas of Tanzania
Protected areas established in 1993
1993 establishments in Tanzania
Geography of Mara Region